Jens Wissing (born 2 January 1988) is a retired German footballer.

External links

 Jens Wissing Interview

1988 births
Living people
German footballers
Borussia Mönchengladbach players
Borussia Mönchengladbach II players
SC Preußen Münster players
SC Paderborn 07 players
MSV Duisburg players
2. Bundesliga players
Association football fullbacks
People from Gronau, North Rhine-Westphalia
Sportspeople from Münster (region)
Footballers from North Rhine-Westphalia
Association football coaches
German expatriate sportspeople in Portugal
S.L. Benfica non-playing staff